Isiala Mbano is a Local Government Area in Imo State, Nigeria. Its headquarters is in the town of Umuelemai. It has an area of 166 square km and a population of 198,736 at the 2006 census. The postal code of the area is 471.

Geographical location

Isiala Mbano is located in the north-eastern area of Imo State capital, Owerri. It is traversed by Owerri/Okigwe / Anara/Umuahia and Okigwe/Umuahia high ways. It is bounded  in the north by Onuimo L.G.A. and some parts of Nwangele L.G.A, in the East by Ehime Mbano L.G.A. and in the south by Ikeduru and Mbaitolu L.G.As respectively.
It occupies a geographical land mass of 148 sq. Kilometers. It has provisional census figure of 198,736 as at the 2006 census.

Polygamy in Isiala Mbano

Polygamy is not an immoral act in the ethical values of the people of Isiala-Mbano. Oral interviews were conducted on men and women who practice polygamy and monogamy in the three clan of Isiala-Mbano Local Government Area of Imo State, Nigeria.

References 

Local Government Areas in Imo State
Local Government Areas in Igboland